Gerina Dunwich (born December 27, 1959, in Chicago, Illinois), is a professional astrologer, occult historian, and New Age author best known for her books on Wicca, and various occult subjects.

Bibliography
The following is a complete list of Gerina Dunwich's published works to date:

 Candlelight Spells (1988) Citadel Press 
 The Magick of Candleburning (1989) Citadel Press 
 Circle of Shadows (1990) Golden Isis Press 
 The Concise Lexicon of the Occult (1990) Citadel Press 
 Wicca Craft (1991) Citadel Press ;  (Portuguese);  (German)
 Secrets of Love Magick (1992) Citadel Press ;  (German);  (Portuguese);  (British)
 The Wicca Spellbook (1993) Citadel Press 
 The Wicca Book of Days (1995) Citadel Press ;  (British)
 The Wicca Source Book (1996) Citadel Press 
 The Wicca Garden (1996) Citadel Press 
 Wicca Love Spells (1996) Citadel Press 
 A Wiccan’s Guide to Prophecy & Divination (1997) Citadel Press 
 Everyday Wicca (1997) Citadel Press 
 Wicca Candle Magick (1997) Citadel Press ;  (Portuguese)
 Magick Potions (1998) Citadel Press 
 Wicca A to Z (1998) Citadel Press ;  (British)
 Wicca Source Book - Revised 2nd Ed. (1998) Citadel Press 
 The Wiccan's Dictionary of Prophecy and Omens (1999) Citadel Press 
 The Pagan Book of Halloween (2000) Penguin/Compass 
 Your Magickal Cat (2000) Citadel Press 
 The Modern Witch's Complete Sourcebook (2001) Citadel Press 
 Exploring Spellcraft (2001) New Page Books 
 Herbal Magick (2002) New Page Books 
 The Cauldron of Dreams (2002) Original Publications 
 A Witch's Guide to Ghosts and the Supernatural (2002) New Page Books 
 A Witch's Book of Spells (2002)
 Dunwich's Guide to Gemstone Sorcery (2003) New Page Books 
 Phantom Felines and Other Ghostly Animals (2006) Citadel Press 
 A Witch's Halloween (2007) Adams Media 

In addition to her own book writing, Gerina Dunwich has contributed to:

 Circles, Groves and Sanctuaries by Dan & Pauline Campanelli (Llewellyn, 1992)
 The Cat Book of Lists by Stephen J. Spignesi (New Page Books, 2001)
 A Witch Like Me by Sirona Knight (New Page Books, 2001)
 The Witch Book by Raymond Buckland (Visible Ink Press, 2002)
 Haunted Northern New York by Cheri Revai (North Country Books, 2002)
 The Action Hero's Handbook by Joe and David Borgenicht (Quirk Books, 2002)
 American Witch by Anthony Paige (Citadel Press, 2003)
 Encyclopedia of Haunted Places by Jeff Belanger (New Page Books, 2005)
 Llewellyn's Witches' Datebook (various years)
 Llewellyn's Witches' Calendar (various years)
 Llewellyn's Magical Almanac (various years)
 Llewellyn's Herbal Almanac (2001)
 Llewellyn's Spell-A-Day Calendar (2001)

See also
 Modern paganism and New Age.

References

1959 births
20th-century astrologers
21st-century astrologers
Living people
American astrologers
American occult writers
Writers from Chicago
American Wiccans
Wiccan writers
People from Fort Covington, New York
Women religious writers
20th-century American women writers
21st-century American women writers
Modern pagan poets
New Age writers